Polyglutamine-binding protein 1 (PQBP1) is a protein that in humans is encoded by the PQBP1 gene. 

Polyglutamine binding protein-1, which was identified as a binding protein to the polyglutamine tract sequence, is an evolutionally conserved protein expressed in various tissues including developmental and adult brains or mesodermal tissues. In cells, PQBP1 is dominantly located in the nucleus but also in the cytoplasm dependently on the cell type and stress conditions.

It should be of note that PQBP1 has no relationship with QBP1, an artificial synthetic peptide.

Function 

PQBP1 is a nuclear polyglutamine-binding protein that contains a WW domain.

The molecular roles of PQBP1 are mainly in mRNA splicing and transcription. PQBP1 interacts with splicing proteins and RNA-binding proteins. PQBP1 deficiency critically affects mRNA splicing of cell cycle and synapse related genes. In addition, recent results indicated implication of PQBP1 in cytoplasmic RNA metabolism and elongation of protein translation from mRNA.

Clinical significance 

Mutations in the PQBP1 gene, which encodes for this protein, have been known to cause X-linked intellectual disabilities (XLID), commonly referred to as Renpenning's syndrome. People who suffer from these disabilities share a common set of symptoms including: microcephaly, shortened stature and impaired intellectual development.  There are 11 types of mutations that have been identified, but the most common being frameshift mutations. Other syndromic XLIDs such as Golabi-Ito-Hall syndrome and non-syndromic ID patients were also associated with PQBP1 gene mutations.   
 
Mutant Ataxin-1 and Huntingtin, disease proteins of spinocerebellar ataxia type-1 and Huntington's disease respectively, interact with PQBP1 and disturbed the functions of PQBP1. Moreover, recent investigations revealed pathological roles of PQBP1 in neurons and microglia under neurodegeneration of Alzheimer's disease and tauopathy. SRRM2 phosphorylation detected in neurons at the early stage of Alzheimer's disease pathology leads to reduction of SRRM2, a scaffold protein for RNA metabolism related molecules in the nucleus, which causes reduction of PQBP1 in the nucleus and acquired intellectual disability.  PQBP1 was shown as an intracellular receptor for HIV1 in dendritic cells for innate immune system. Similarly, PQBP1 functions as an intracellular receptor for tau proteins and trigger brain inflammation.

Animal models 
Mouse models of knockdown and conditional knockout were generated, and they showed cognitive impairment and microcephaly. The KD mice possess a transgene expressing 498 bp double-strand RNA that is endogenously cleaved to siRNA suppressing PQBP1 efficiently, and did not show obvious developmental abnormality. Another knockdown model of the gene in mouse embryo primary neurons revealed a decrease in splicing efficiency and resulted in abnormal gastrulation and neuralation patterning.
 
Drosophila models of underexpression and overexpression were also generated. The hypomorph Drosophila model revealed molecular function of PQBP1 in learning acquisition mediated by decreased mRNA and protein expressions of NMDA receptor subunit NR1. Research indicates that in order to appropriately function, the protein must be expressed within a critical range.

References

Further reading

External links